Kurupuzha  is a village in Thiruvananthapuram district in the state of Kerala, India.

Demographics
 India census, Kurupuzha had a population of 11630 with 5503 males and 6127 females.

References

Villages in Thiruvananthapuram district